Wolfgang Helfrich (born 25 March 1932) is a German physicist and inventor recognized for his contributions to twisted-nematic liquid crystal technology, which is used to produce a variety of modern LCD electronic displays.

Career 
Helfrich studied physics in Munich, Göttingen, and Tübingen. Helfrich joined RCA in 1967, became interested in Charles-Victor Mauguin's twisted structure, and thought it might be used to create an electronic display. However, RCA showed little interest, because they felt that any effect that used two polarizers would also have a large amount of light absorption, requiring it to be brightly lit.

In 1970, Helfrich left RCA and joined the Central Research Laboratories of Hoffmann-LaRoche in Switzerland, where he teamed up with Swiss physicist Martin Schadt, a solid-state physicist. Schadt built a sample with electrodes and a twisted version of a liquid-crystal material called PEBAB (p-ethoxybenzylidene-p'-aminobenzonitrile), which Helfrich had reported in prior studies at RCA, as part of their guest-host experiments.

From 1973 until his retirement in 1997, Helfrich worked for Free University of Berlin. Helfrich lives in Berlin.

Works 
 Liquid Crystals of One- and Two-Dimensional Order - Berlin, Heidelberg : Springer Berlin Heidelberg, 1980      
 Raumladungsbegrenzte und volumenbestimmte Ströme in organischen Festkörpern - Munich 1967    
 Space-charge-limited and volume-controlled currents in organic solid - Munich 1967    
 Raumladungsbeschränkte Ströme in Anthrazen als Mittel zur Bestimmung der Beweglichkeit von Defektelektronen - Munich 1961    
 Untersuchungen an raumladungsbeschränkten Defektelektronenströmen in Anthrazen - Munich 1961

Awards 
 1976 EPS Europhysics Prize
 2008 IEEE Jun-ichi Nishizawa Medal
 2012 Sackler Prize
 2012 Charles Stark Draper Prize for Engineering

References

External links 

IEEE Global History Network profile

20th-century German physicists
20th-century German inventors
Academic staff of the Free University of Berlin
Draper Prize winners
1932 births
Living people
RCA people